Saskatoon City may refer to:
 Saskatoon, Saskatchewan, Canada
 Saskatoon City (electoral district), a Canadian federal riding from 1935 to 1949
 Saskatoon City (provincial electoral district), a Saskatchewan provincial riding from 1908 to 1969